The women's 400 metres hurdles event at the 1982 Commonwealth Games was held on 5 and 7 October at the QE II Stadium in Brisbane, Australia. It was the first time that women competed in this event at the Commonwealth Games.

Medalists

Results

Heats
Qualification: First 4 in each heat (Q) and the next 1 fastest (q) qualify for the final.

Final

References

Heats results (The Sydney Morning Herald)
Final results (The Sydney Morning Herald)
Heats results (The Canberra Times)
Final results (The Canberra Times)
Australian results 

Athletics at the 1982 Commonwealth Games
1982